Fenâri Îsâ Mosque (full name in ), in Byzantine times known as the Lips Monastery, is a mosque in Istanbul, made of two former Eastern Orthodox churches.

Location
The complex is located in the Fatih district of Istanbul, Turkey, along the Adnan Menderes (formerly Vatan) Avenue.

History

Byzantine period 

In 908, the Byzantine admiral Constantine Lips inaugurated a nunnery in the presence of the Emperor Leo VI the Wise (r. 886–912). The nunnery was dedicated to the Virgin Theotokos Panachrantos ("Immaculate Mother of God") in a place called "Merdosangaris", in the valley of the Lycus (the river of Constantinople). The nunnery was known also after his name (Monē tou Libos), and became one of the largest of Constantinople.

The church was built on the remains of another shrine from the 6th century, and used the tombstones of an ancient Roman cemetery. Relics of Saint Irene were stored here. The church is generally known as "North Church".

After the Latin invasion and the restoration of the Byzantine Empire, between 1286 and 1304, Empress Theodora, widow of Emperor Michael VIII Palaiologos (r. 1259–1282), erected another church dedicated to St. John the Baptist (Ἐκκλησία τοῦ Ἁγίου Ἰωάννου Προδρόμου τοῦ Λιβός) south of the first church. Several exponents of the imperial dynasty of the Palaiologos were buried there besides Theodora: her son Constantine, Empress Irene of Montferrat and her husband Emperor Andronikos II (r. 1282–1328). This church is generally known as the "South Church". 
The Empress restored also the nunnery, which by that time had been possibly abandoned. According to its typikon, the nunnery at that time hosted a total of 50 women and also a Xenon for laywomen with 15 beds attached.

During the 14th century an esonarthex and a parekklesion were added to the church. The custom of burying members of the imperial family in the complex continued in the 15th century with Anna, first wife of Emperor John VIII Palaiologos (r. 1425–1448), in 1417. The church was possibly used as a cemetery also after 1453.

Ottoman period 
In 1497–1498, shortly after the Fall of Constantinople and during the reign of Sultan Beyazid II (1481–1512), the south church was converted into a mescit (a small mosque) by the Ottoman dignitary Fenarizade Alâeddin Ali ben Yusuf Effendi, Qadi 'asker of Rumeli, and nephew of Molla Şemseddin Fenari, whose family belonged to the religious class of the ulema. He built a minaret in the southeast angle, and a mihrab in the apse. Since one of the head preachers of the madrasah was named Îsâ ("Jesus" in Arabic and Turkish), his name was added to that of the mosque. The edifice burned down in 1633, was restored in 1636 by Grand Vizier Bayram Pasha, who upgraded the building to cami ("mosque") and converted the north church into a tekke (a dervish lodge). In this occasion the columns of the north church were substituted with piers, the two domes were renovated, and the mosaic decoration was removed. After another fire in 1782, the complex was restored again in 1847/48. In this occasion also the columns of the south church were substituted with piers, and the balustrade parapets of the narthex were removed too. The building burned once more in 1918, and was abandoned. During excavations performed in 1929, twenty-two sarcophagi have been found. The complex has been thoroughly restored between the 1950s and 1960s by the Byzantine Institute of America, and since then serves again as a mosque.

Architecture and decoration

North church
The north church has an unusual quincuncial (cross-in-square) plan, and was one of the first shrines in Constantinople to adopt this plan, whose prototype is possibly the Nea Ekklesia ("New Church"), erected in Constantinople in the year 880, of which no remains are extant. During the Ottoman period the four columns have been replaced with two pointed arches which span the whole church.

The masonry of the northern church was erected by alternating courses of bricks and small rough stone blocks. In this technique, which is typical of the Byzantine architecture of the 10th century, the bricks sink in a thick bed of mortar. The building is topped by an Ottoman dome pierced by eight windows.
 
This edifice has three high apses: the central one is polygonal, and is flanked by the other two, which served as pastophoria: prothesis and diakonikon.

The apses are interrupted by triple (by the central one)and single lancet windows. The walls of the central arms of the naos cross have two orders of windows: the lower order has triple lancet windows, the higher semicircular windows. Two long parekklesia, each one ended by a low apse, flanks the presbytery of the naos. The angular and central bays are very slender. At the four edges of the building are four small roof chapels, each surmounted by a cupola.

The remainders of the original decoration of this church are the bases of three of the four columns of the central bay, and many original decorating elements, which survive on the pillars of the windows and on the frame of the dome. The decoration consisted originally in marble panels and coloured tiles: the vaults were decorated with mosaic. Only spurs of it are now visible.

As a whole, the north church presents strong analogies with the Bodrum Mosque (the church of Myrelaion).

South church
The south church is a square room surmounted by a dome, and surrounded by two deambulatoria, an esonarthex and a parekklesion (added later). The north deambulatorium is the south parekklesion of the north church. This multiplication of spaces around the central part of the church, typical of late Palaiologian architecture, was motivated by the need for more space for tombs, monuments erected to benefactors of the church, etc. The central room is divided from the aisles by a triple arcade. During the mass the believers were confined in the deambulatoria, which were shallow and dark, and could barely see what happened in the central part of the church.

The masonry is composed of alternated courses of bricks and stone, typical of late Byzantine architecture in Constantinople.

The lush decoration of the south and of the main apses (the latter is heptagonal), is made of a triple order of niches, the middle order being alternated with triple windows. The bricks are arranged to form patterns like arches, hooks, Greek frets, sun crosses, swastikas and fans. Between these patterns are white and dark red bands, alternating one course of stone with two to five of bricks. This is the first appearance of this most important decorating aspect of Palaiologian architecture in Constantinople.

The church has an exonarthex surmounted by a gallery, which was extended to reach also the north church. The parekklesion was erected alongside the southern side of the south church, and was connected with the esonarthex, so that the room surrounds the whole complex on the west and south side. Several marble sarcophagi are placed within it.

As a whole, this complex represents a notable example of middle and late Byzantine Architecture in Istanbul.

See also
History of Roman and Byzantine domes

References

Sources

 (Note. While the page numbers in the citations refer to the Italian edition, an English edition - not as up-to-date as the Italian one - is also available)

External links 

 Byzantium 1200 - Lips Monastery
 "Typikon of Theodora Palaiologina for the Convent of Lips in Constantinople" (trans. Alice-Mary Talbot), from Byzantine Monastic Foundation Documents: A Complete Translation of the Surviving Founder's Typika and Testaments, Thomas, J. & Hero, A.C. (eds.) (Dumbarton Oaks Research Library and Collection, Washington D.C. 2000)

10th-century churches
Religious buildings and structures completed in 1497
15th-century mosques
Byzantine church buildings in Istanbul
Fatih
Religious buildings and structures completed in 908
Burial sites of the Palaiologos dynasty